The Lok Kalyan Marg Metro Station is located on the Yellow Line of the Delhi Metro.

It serves the Lok Kalyan Marg area in Central Delhi, and the Prime Minister's official residence, 7, Lok Kalyan Marg is located nearby.

History
The station was originally named Race Course Road but was subsequently renamed when the road was given its current name in 2016.

Station layout

Facilities

Entry/exit

Connections

Bus
Delhi Transport Corporation bus routes number 433, 433CL, 433LnkSTL, 460, 460CL, 460STL, 480, 500, 520, 540, 540CL, 548, 548CL, 548EXT, 610, 610A, 725, 780, 781, 990B, AC-781, serves the station from nearby P.S. Tughlaq Road bus stop.

See also
New Delhi
List of Delhi Metro stations
Transport in Delhi
Delhi Metro Rail Corporation
Delhi Suburban Railway
Delhi Transport Corporation
Central Delhi
National Capital Region (India)
List of rapid transit systems
List of metro systems

References

External links

 Delhi Metro Rail Corporation Ltd. (Official site) 
 Delhi Metro Annual Reports
 

Delhi Metro stations
Railway stations opened in 2010
Railway stations in New Delhi district
2010 establishments in Delhi